The French Legion of Veterans (or LFC) was an organisation established consolidate pre-war associations of war veterans in Vichy France and Vichy's colonial territories.

See also 
 Service d'ordre légionnaire

Further reading

Voyage dans la France de Vichy : la Légion française des combattants, special issue of the Annales du Midi (116/245 (2004)).

Vichy France